Hydrant No. 3 House is a historic fire station on Washington Street in the former village of Metcalf in Holliston, Massachusetts.  It is referred to locally as the Metcalf Pump House.  The single-story wood-frame building was built c. 1871, and was designed to house a single period fire engine.  The building's principal ornamentation is its hose tower, which is topped by an Italianate-style cupola.  It is the town's oldest surviving fire house, and one of only a few 19th-century municipal buildings in the town.  The building remained in service until 1899.  The original No. 3 engine is in storage, and was restored in 1950.  The building is now maintained by volunteers.

The building was added to the National Register of Historic Places in 2000.

See also
Metcalf, Massachusetts
National Register of Historic Places listings in Middlesex County, Massachusetts

References

Fire stations completed in 1871
Fire stations on the National Register of Historic Places in Massachusetts
Buildings and structures in Holliston, Massachusetts
National Register of Historic Places in Middlesex County, Massachusetts
Defunct fire stations in Massachusetts